Trycherodes is a moth genus of the family Depressariidae.

Species
 Trycherodes albifrons (Walsingham, 1912)
 Trycherodes chilibrella (Busck, 1914)
 Trycherodes producta (Walsingham, 1912)

References

Depressariinae